The 1995–96 Iowa Hawkeyes men's basketball team represented the University of Iowa as members of the Big Ten Conference. The team was led by 10th year head coach Tom Davis, and played their home games at Carver-Hawkeye Arena. They finished the season 24–8 overall and 12–6 in Big Ten play. The Hawkeyes received an at-large bid to the NCAA tournament as #6 seed in the West Region.

Roster

Schedule/Results

|-
!colspan=9| Non-conference regular season
|-

|-
!colspan=9| Big Ten Regular Season
|-

|-
!colspan=9| NCAA tournament

Rankings

Awards and honors
 Jess Settles – Honorable Mention AP All-American; First-Team All-Big Ten
 Andre Woolridge – First-Team All-Big Ten

Team players in the 1996 NBA draft

References

Iowa
Iowa
Iowa Hawkeyes men's basketball seasons
Hawk
Hawk